DeRose or Derose is a French surname that was first used seen and recorded in Limousin. It also occurs as an Italian surname (although DeRosa is more common in Italy).

Persons with the name include:
Anthony Lewis DeRose, American itinerant painter
Chris DeRose (born 1948), American animal rights activist
Chris DeRose (author) (born 1980), American writer
Daniel Eugene DeRose (born 1962), American businessperson
Dena DeRose (born 1966), American jazz pianist, singer and educator
Jason DeRose, American journalist
Jim DeRose (born 1967), American college soccer coach
Kathleen Traynor DeRose, American fintech expert and a finance professor
Keith DeRose (born 1962), American philosopher
Lenny DeRose, Canadian studio engineer and music producer
Peter DeRose (1900–1953), American composer
Philippe Derose (born 1952), American politician
Steven DeRose (born 1960), American linguist

References

French-language surnames